Reply 1997 is a 2012 South Korean television series that centers on the lives of six friends in Busan, as the timeline moves back and forth between their past as 18-year-old high schoolers in 1997 and their present as 33-year-olds at their high school reunion dinner in 2012, where one couple will announce that they're getting married. As the first installment of the Reply series, it also portrays the extreme fan culture that emerged in the 1990s when first generation idol groups such as H.O.T. and Sechs Kies took center stage and K-pop was just beginning to blossom.

The series is one of the highest-rated Korean dramas in cable television history, and has garnered praise from audiences and critics for being well-researched, refreshing, genuine, and full of humor and heart.

Summary
Set in 1997, the series follows female high school student Sung Shi-won (Jung Eun-ji), who idolizes boyband H.O.T, and the lives of her five high school friends. As a teen, Shi-won was obsessed with a boy band. Now 33 years old, Shi-won and her friends are reliving their memories at their high school reunion.

Cast

Main
 Jung Eun-ji as Sung Shi-won
A devoted fangirl of boyband H.O.T., who dreams of marrying Tony. Though Shi-won has the worst grades in her class and always has her head in the clouds, she is also forthright and sassy.
 Seo In-guk as Yoon Yoon-jae
Quiet and brooding yet devoted to those close to him, Yoon-jae is Shi-won's childhood best friend who frequently spends time at her house following the death of his own parents. He is also known as one of the two most handsome boys in the school, alongside Joon-hee, and girls often fall for the both of them. He is intelligent and at the top of his class. As a teenager, Yoon-jae falls for Shi-won, and tries to keep it a secret.
Hoya as Kang Joon-hee
Joon-hee is shy and sweet, and is Yoon-jae's best friend and right-hand man. Like Yoon-jae, girls fall for him easily, and he often spends time with Shi-won. He harbors the secret that he is gay and is in love with his best friend Yoon-jae, which only Shi-won is aware of after he confides in her.
 Shin So-yul as Mo Yoo-jung
Shi-won's best friend, despite the occasional argument following the revelation that Yoo-jung is a fan of Sechs Kies, a rival boy band. Yoo-jung is known to be very fickle when it comes to love, falling for boys - whether in real life or in the celebrity world - at the drop of a hat.
 Eun Ji-won as Do Hak-chan
A transfer student from Seoul. Hak-chan loves sports and has a comically large pornography collection. He is outgoing around his friends, yet his major weakness is his inability to interact with girls - however, he eventually falls for Yoo-jung.
 Lee Si-eon as Bang Sung-jae
The mile-a-minute talker and one-man rumor mill of the group.
 Sung Dong-il as Sung Dong-il 
 Kang Kyun-sung as young Dong-il in 1968 (ep. 9)
Shi-won's father and a baseball coach of the Busan Seagulls.
 Lee Il-hwa as Lee Il-hwa 
 Park Cho-rong as young Lee Il-hwa in 1968 (ep. 9)
Shi-won's mother and a housewife.
 Song Jong-ho as Yoon Tae-woong
A teacher at the high school. Tae-woong turns out to be Yoon-jae's older brother, and had previously been engaged to Shi-won's late elder sister prior to her death. However, over the course of the show, Tae-woong also falls for Shi-won.

Supporting
 Noh Ji-yeon as Jang Dan-ji - Moon Hee-joon fangirl
 Jung Kyung-mi as Kyung-mi / "Eun Dokki" (Eun Axe) - Sechs Kies fangirl, a bully at the school who believes Eun Ji-won has chosen her, and who is in love with Yoon-jae and Joon-hee, and clashes with Shi-won on the subject, while vying for both boys' attention.
 Kim Sun-ah as Kim Sun-ah / "Eun Gak-ha" - Sechs Kies fangirl, the accomplice of Kyung-mi, who also is in love with Yoon-jae and Joon-hee.

Special appearances

 Tony Ahn as himself (ep. 1, 3, 6)
 Kim Gook-jin as himself (ep. 1)
 Kim Ye-won as Sung Song-joo (ep. 3, 4, 9)
 Moon Hee-joon as himself (voice) (ep. 3)
 Im Si-wan as ROTC chatmate (ep. 4)
 Lee Yoon-seok as Gyu-gaeng, bungeoppang vendor (ep. 5)
 Kim Jong-min as driver in car accident (ep. 5)
 Shin Bong-sun as Busan H.O.T. fanclub president (ep. 6)
 Jung Joo-ri as noraebang customer (ep. 8)
 Jung Myung-ok as noraebang customer (ep. 8)
 Kim Tae-won as noraebang customer (ep. 8)
 Choo Min-ki as Choo Shin-soo (ep. 8)
 Ryu Dam as Lee Dae-ho (ep. 8)
 Yang Joon-hyuk as Yoon Joon-hyuk, Yoon-je's father (ep. 9)
 Son Jin-young as young Joon-hyuk in 1968 (ep. 9)
 Lee Yeon-kyung as Moon Jung-mi, Yoon-je's mother (ep. 9)
 Yoon Bo-mi as young Moon Jung-mi in 1968 (ep. 9)
 Kim Ki-wook as cellphone store salesman (ep. 9)
 Park Ji-yoon as Joon-hee's sixth older sister at noraebang (ep. 8) / seventh older sister at pojangmacha (ep. 10)
 Yoon Hyung-bin as Eun Gak-ha's husband (ep. 9, 10)
 Yang Se-hyung as Eun Dokki's husband (ep. 9, 10)
 Ahn Young-mi as Sechs Kies fanclub president (ep. 10)
 Kang Yumi as H.O.T. fanclub president (ep. 10)
 Kim Dae-ju as PD with megaphone (ep. 10)
 Shin Dong-yup as MC of the 1998 Golden Disk Awards (voice) (ep. 10)
 Lee Joo-yeon as Doctor Lee Joo-won (ep. 14, 16)
 Lee Sol-ji as TV show host (ep. 15)
 Go In-bum as Dong-il's uncle (ep. 15)
 G.NA as blind date (ep. 15)
 Bae Da-hae as Yoon-je's colleague and drinking buddy (ep. 16)

Production
The series originally aired live on cable channel tvN with 16 episodes (fourteen 30-minute episodes aired back-to-back over a period of 7 weeks, with the last 2 episodes aired separately and lasting 1 hour each due to the amount of material the staff didn't want to edit out). However, due to its popularity, the 15th and 16th episodes were also aired simultaneously on Mnet, OCN, O'live, Ongamenet and OnStyle.

This drama served as the acting debut of Jung Eun-ji.

Soundtrack
The '90s-set drama didn't have an original soundtrack of its own since a huge aspect of the show's mood is set with era-specific music, one of its defining characteristics. Instead, lead actors Jung Eun-ji and Seo In-guk recorded a 2-part mini OST entitled Love Story to thank fans and viewers of the show. Seo was the first season winner of the music audition program Superstar K, and Eun-ji is the main vocalist of K-pop girl group A Pink. Their duet in Part 1 was a remake of 1990s idol group Cool's "All For You." Their duet in Part 2 is a remake of "Just the Way We Love", from the soundtrack of 1999 film Love Wind Love Song.

The two singles topped the Gaon Single Chart and Billboard's K-Pop Hot 100, and "All For You" became one of the best-selling singles of that year with 2,499,273 downloads. Jung and Seo also gave a live performance on Mnet's M! Countdown on 6 September 2012, and on 19 September, the song "All For You" ranked first on another music program, Music Triangle.

Due to popular demand, CJ E&M eventually released a "Director's Edition" soundtrack that feature Jung and Seo's 2 covers, as well as '90s songs played throughout the series. It also included a mini photobook and a behind-the-scenes DVD. Before its official release, the album sold out its 12,500 units via pre-order, surpassing the average soundtrack sales figure of 5,000.

Reception and impact
The TV serial mostly consisted of idol singers with scant acting experience, and apart from the meta casting of Sechs Kies member Eun Ji-won (who previously worked with director Shin Won-ho and the writing staff on the variety show 1 Night & 2 Days), it premiered with little hype. But through strong word of mouth, it soon gained recognition as a high-quality production with a distinct sense of identity, becoming a buzz-worthy "syndrome" show (the Korean slang term for a hit show with an ardent fanbase).

With Korean cable shows generally considered successful if they hit 1%, Reply 1997 took cable ratings by storm, and received an immense amount of attention and critical praise. The show has been credited for its laser-sharp attention to detail, re-creating the late '90s with an accuracy that had fans singing its praises. Endless pop culture references are packed into every minute of the show, with little pop culture easter eggs hidden in scenes, callbacks to the trends of the day, and cameos that are in-jokes.

It was also a digital success, receiving more than a million hits after it was made available for downloading and streaming on internet and mobile site Tving. This was attributed to the fact that Reply 1997 had aired on a cable network (pay television channel), such that several viewers were unable to watch it live.

With the majority of Korean dramas shot in the capital city of Seoul, another of the show's charms is its Busan setting, which is treated in a matter-of-fact way as a locale. The realism is aided by the fact that much of the principal cast actually hails from the region, who speak with the authentic Gyeongsang dialect. The dialogue also uses time-specific, location-specific slang.

But '90s nostalgia and meticulous attention to detail is only part of the show's appeal. Fans were also intrigued by the clues that the 2012 scenes dropped at regular intervals about who ends up together, as well as the episodes' subtle twists. And its smart, witty way of addressing the growing pains of its adolescent cast makes it just as relevant in the present as it was back in the late-'90s setting of its primary plot. Audiences have lauded the show's intimacy and realism, with a sincerity that connects with people — even those outside that particular generation.

Seo In-guk, Eun Ji-won, Lee Si-eon and Shin So-yul hosted the 15 September 2012 episode of sketch comedy show Saturday Night Live Korea, which included skits that parody scenes in their series. On 20 September 2012, a special was aired on tvN's enews featuring behind-the-scenes videos and a few bloopers from the set.

A novelization was published in January 2013.

Director Shin Won-ho re-edited all 16 episodes for a special director's cut DVD, released in February 2013. It also included 358 minutes of exclusive behind-the-scenes footage, a blooper reel, as well as commentary from the director and actors.

The show was said to have sparked the "retro" trend in South Korea and the media and cultural commentators have noted an increased interest in the pop culture of the 1990s after the show aired. Notably, the show garnered more interest in "first generation" K-pop idol groups whose heyday took place during the 1990s prior to the Korean Wave, hence not being as well known to international audiences as their much younger counterparts. Not long after the show concluded, Eun and H.O.T members Moon Hee-joon and Tony An joined two other members of fellow first-generation groups in filming their own variety show Handsome Boys of the 20th Century, which Moon called the "reality-variety show version of Reply 1997". In 2014, the highly successful comebacks of Seo Taiji, g.o.d and Fly to the Sky further added to the retro wave. The variety show Infinite Challenge began airing the "Saturday, Saturday is for Singers" (ToToGa) segment which specifically features artists and groups popular during the 1990s and has directly led to the reunions of first-generation groups Jinusean, S.E.S, Sechs Kies and H.O.T after over a decade of inactivity or disbandment.

Ratings
In this table,  represent the lowest ratings and  represent the highest ratings.

Awards and nominations

Spin-offs

Another series from the same writer and director, Reply 1994 was produced in 2013. Set in a college campus, it follows the pop culture events of that year, including the emergence of seminal K-pop group Seo Taiji and Boys and the basketball craze of the era. It also starred Sung Dong-il and Lee Il-hwa, but as different characters. Younger cast members Jung Eun-ji, Seo In-guk, Hoya, Lee Si-eon, Shin So-yul, Eun Ji-won, and Lee Jooyeon reprised their Reply 1997 roles in cameo appearances.

A second spin-off, Reply 1988, aired in 2015. Sung Dong-il and Lee Il-hwa again joined the cast.

Remake
An American remake, Answer Me 1999 is in development at Fox, written by Amy Andelson and Emily Meyer (Step Up 3D), with the pilot episode directed by Jon M. Chu.

References

External links
  
  
 
 

2012 South Korean television series debuts
2012 South Korean television series endings
2010s teen drama television series
Korean-language television shows
TVN (South Korean TV channel) television dramas
Television series set in 1997
South Korean LGBT-related television shows
Television shows set in Busan
Television series by CJ E&M
South Korean comedy-drama television series
South Korean teen dramas
2010s LGBT-related comedy television series
2010s LGBT-related drama television series
Television series about teenagers